This is a timeline of terrorist attacks in the United States throughout history.

Attacks by date

1776–99

1800–99

1900–59

1960–69

1970–79

1980–89

1990–99

2000–09

2010–19

2020–present

References

Lists of terrorist incidents in the United States
United States history timelines